Bigger and Blackerer is a 2010 album and DVD by American stand-up comedian David Cross. The album's title plays on Chris Rock's comedy album, Bigger & Blacker, and the cover plays off of the popular art form of painting on black velvet, such as Velvet Elvis (and is reminiscent of the Ray Charles album Ray Charles Greatest Hits). Cross taped and recorded the album during two shows at the Wilbur Theatre in Boston.

Track listing

Bigger and Blackerer does not follow the non-sequitur track titling of Cross' previous albums, Shut Up You Fucking Baby! and It's Not Funny.

 "Opening Song (The Sultan's Revenge)" – 4:18
 "If You Care" – 1:44
 "That One Show About Drugs And Stuff" – 6:13
 "Me And Drugs" – 8:29
 "Black Stuff" – 2:48
 "...Or Worse" – 4:41
 "Where We Are Now Back In Sept. '09" – 9:06
 "Silly Religious Crazies" – 5:59
 "Really Silly Religious Crazies. I Mean, Double, Triple Crazy!!" – 3:40
 "Random Goofabouts" – 9:07
 "I Can't Get Beer In Me..." – 2:40
 "Lesson Learned" – 3:50

Reception

The A.V. Club gave the album a B+. Pitchfork Media gave the album a 5.6.

References

External links
 Bigger and Blackerer at SubPop.com

Sub Pop live albums
Stand-up comedy on DVD
2010 live albums
David Cross albums
Stand-up comedy albums
2010s comedy albums
2010s spoken word albums
Spoken word albums by American artists
Live spoken word albums